Szklana Huta may refer to the following places:
Szklana Huta, Kuyavian-Pomeranian Voivodeship (north-central Poland)
Szklana Huta, Łódź Voivodeship (central Poland)
Szklana Huta, Świętokrzyskie Voivodeship (south-central Poland)
Szklana Huta, Greater Poland Voivodeship (west-central Poland)
Szklana Huta, Silesian Voivodeship (south Poland)
Szklana Huta, Pomeranian Voivodeship
Szklana Huta, Kartuzy County in Pomeranian Voivodeship (north Poland)
Szklana Huta, Wejherowo County in Pomeranian Voivodeship (north Poland)